Gordon Elementary School can refer to:
 California
 Gordon Elementary School in Fairfield, California - Fairfield-Suisun Unified School District
 Illinois
 John Gordon Elementary School in Posen, Illinois - Posen-Robbins School District 143½
 Michigan
 Gordon Elementary School in Marshall, Michigan - Marshall Public Schools
 New Jersey
 Robert Gordon Elementary School in Roselle Park, New Jersey - Roselle Park School District
 North Carolina
 Gordon Elementary School in Cameron, North Carolina (Fort Bragg) - U.S. Department of Defense Education Activity
 South Carolina
 Gordon Elementary School in Dillon, South Carolina - Dillon School District Four
 Rudolph Gordon Elementary School in Simpsonville, South Carolina - Greenville County Schools
 Tennessee
 Gordon Elementary School in Memphis, Tennessee - Memphis City Schools
 Texas
 Maud W. Gordon Elementary School (now the Mandarin Chinese Language Immersion Magnet School) in Bellaire, Texas (Greater Houston) - Houston Independent School District
 Virginia
 Gordon Elementary School near Richmond, Virginia - Chesterfield County Public Schools
 Washington
 Richard Gordon Elementary School in Kingston, Washington - North Kitsap School District